Corey Antoine Maggette (born November 12, 1979) is an American former professional basketball player who played 14 seasons in the National Basketball Association (NBA). He became an analyst for Fox Sports.

High school and college career
Maggette excelled at Fenwick High School in Oak Park, Illinois where he was an All-American in basketball.

Along with Duke teammates Elton Brand and William Avery, he is notable for being one of the first Duke players to leave before the end of his athletic eligibility during the tenure of coach Mike Krzyzewski.

In July 2000, Maggette signed a sworn statement that as a high schooler, he accepted $2,000 from his Amateur Athletic Union summer league coach Myron Piggie, a move that put his eligibility at Duke in question. In 2004, the NCAA decided not to punish Duke because they were found to have been unaware about Maggette's eligibility issue while at Duke.

NBA career

Orlando Magic (1999–2000)
Maggette was selected with the 13th overall pick in the 1999 NBA draft by the Seattle SuperSonics but was later traded to the Orlando Magic on draft night along with Dale Ellis, Don MacLean, and Billy Owens for Horace Grant and 2nd round draft picks from the 2000 and 2001 drafts. Maggette was the only player retained by the Magic from the trade. As a rookie in 1999–2000, he averaged 8.4 points and 3.9 rebounds over 77 games and scored a season-high 20 points on January 3 against the Detroit Pistons.

Los Angeles Clippers (2000–2008)
On June 28, 2000, Maggette was traded, along with Keyon Dooling, Derek Strong, and cash considerations, to the Los Angeles Clippers in exchange for a 2006 first-round pick. During his career with the Clippers, Maggette, whose teammates nicknamed him "Maximus," established himself as a solid forward and developed into a perennial 15+ per game scorer. He became known for excellent jumping ability as well as his propensity to create contact and get to the free throw line – he was consistently among the league leaders in free throws attempted and made. Maggette participated in the Slam Dunk Contest at the 2001 NBA All-Star Weekend and experienced a good year in 2004–05, touting career-highs in points, rebounds, assists and free throw percentage. Bothered by a nagging foot injury, he sat out much of the 2005–06 season. On April 22, 2006, Maggette and his teammates helped the Clippers win their first NBA playoff game in 13 years by defeating the Denver Nuggets in Game 1 of their first-round match-up. Two days later, the team won their second playoff game, going 2–0 against an opponent for the first time in franchise history. On May 1, 2006, they defeated the Nuggets in Game 5 and, as a result, their first playoff series since they moved from Buffalo. In the Western Conference semifinals, the Clippers faced the Phoenix Suns and lost in seven games. In a series-saving 118–106 Game 6 win over the Suns, Maggette came off the bench to score 25 points while shooting 7-of-8 shooting from the field and 9-of-9 from the free throw line – the best playoff performance of his career.

Maggette returned strongly during the 2006–07 season despite an alleged feud with coach Mike Dunleavy. Maggette had a career-high night against the Los Angeles Lakers on April 12, 2007, scoring 39 points to secure a 118–110 victory after recovering from a 17-point deficit.

On June 30, 2008, Maggette opted out of the final year of his contract with the Clippers and officially became an unrestricted free agent.

Golden State Warriors (2008–2010)
On July 10, 2008, Maggette signed a five-year, $50 million contract with the Golden State Warriors. Upon signing with the Warriors, general manager Chris Mullin said of Maggette, "He gets his points and rebounds. But I just think it's his approach to the work and his lifestyle that will be a huge benefit for our young guys. They can watch him, see how he approaches it and maybe they can emulate him."

Playing a sixth man role for the Warriors, Maggette averaged 19.3 points and 5.4 rebounds in 121 games over two seasons for the franchise.

Milwaukee Bucks (2010–2011)
On June 22, 2010, Maggette was traded, along with a 2010 second-round pick, to the Milwaukee Bucks in exchange for Charlie Bell and Dan Gadzuric. On January 22, 2011, Maggette scored 12 points, grabbed 8 rebounds, and recorded a season-high 5 assists in a loss against the Memphis Grizzlies. On January 28, he recorded season-highs with 29 points and 11 rebounds in a 116–110 win over the Toronto Raptors.

Charlotte Bobcats (2011–2012)
On June 23, 2011, Maggette was traded to the Charlotte Bobcats as part of a three-team deal that also involved the Sacramento Kings. He managed just 32 games for the Bobcats in the lockout-shortened season, scoring a season-high 29 points on March 6, 2012 against the Orlando Magic.

Detroit Pistons (2012–2013)
On June 26, 2012, Maggette was traded to the Detroit Pistons in exchange for Ben Gordon and a future first-round draft pick. After missing the first eight games of the 2012–13 season while nursing a calf injury suffered in preseason, Maggette made his Pistons debut on November 14, recording 9 points and 3 assists off the bench in a 94–76 win over the Philadelphia 76ers. He managed to play the next 17 games before being sitting out the rest of the season from mid-December onwards due to personal reasons mixed with not being played by coach Lawrence Frank and citing his lack of interest in the game.

Following the 2012–13 season, he became a free agent and subsequently signed a training camp deal with the San Antonio Spurs on September 30, 2013. However, he was later waived by the Spurs on October 15 after appearing in two preseason games. He later retired from basketball after 14 years in the NBA.

Post-playing career
In October 2014, Maggette joined Fox Sports West and Prime Ticket as an analyst for the Los Angeles Clippers. He later joined Fox Sports 1 as a college basketball analyst.

In 2017, Maggette joined the BIG3 team Power for their inaugural season which ended with him suffering a torn achilles in his team's opening game.  In August 2018, Maggette was named 2018 BIG3 MVP and Captain of the Year after leading the Power to a 7–1 regular season record. Led by Naismith Memorial Basketball Hall of Famer Nancy Lieberman as coach and league MVP Maggette's 27 points, team Power won the championship game 51–43.  In May 2019, Maggette returned to the BIG3 to defend his team's championship, his MVP status and his team's health.

Public life
Off the court, Maggette worked with children as a member of the Clippers Reading All-Star Team. His "Uh Oh Maggette-O Kids" program brought hundreds of children to Clippers games for free. In 1999, he established his own "Corey Maggette Flight 50 Basketball Camp" and initially invited 50 kids to the first year's camp. After almost a decade, the camp was taking over 600 kids to its camps each year and won an "NBA Player's Best Camp Award" for its efforts. In June 2006, he also established "Corey Cares Foundation" to serve, mentor and inspire the less fortunate in the community of basketball and sports.

In 2007, Maggette made a brief guest appearance in the music video for Common's Drivin' Me Wild.

NBA career statistics

Regular season

|-
| align="left" | 
| align="left" | Orlando
| 77 || 5 || 17.8 || .478 || .182 || .751 || 3.9 || .8 || .3 || .3 || 8.4
|-
| align="left" | 
| align="left" | L.A. Clippers
| 69 || 9 || 19.7 || .462 || .304 || .774 || 4.2 || 1.2 || .5 || .1 || 10.0
|-
| align="left" | 
| align="left" | L.A. Clippers
| 63 || 52 || 25.6 || .443 || .331 || .801 || 3.7 || 1.8 || .7 || .3 || 11.4
|-
| align="left" | 
| align="left" | L.A. Clippers
| 64 || 57 || 31.3 || .444 || .350 || .802 || 5.0 || 1.9 || .9 || .3 || 16.8
|-
| align="left" | 
| align="left" | L.A. Clippers
| 73 || 72 || 36.0 || .447 || .329 || .848 || 5.9 || 3.1 || .9 || .2 || 20.7
|-
| align="left" | 
| align="left" | L.A. Clippers
| 66 || 60 || 36.9 || .431 || .304 || .857 || 6.0 || 3.4 || 1.1 || .1 || 22.2
|-
| align="left" | 
| align="left" | L.A. Clippers
| 32 || 13 || 29.5 || .445 || .338 || .828 || 5.3 || 2.1 || .6 || .1 || 17.8
|-
| align="left" | 
| align="left" | L.A. Clippers
| 75 || 31 || 30.5 || .454 || .200 || .820 || 5.9 || 2.8 || .9 || .2 || 16.9
|-
| align="left" | 
| align="left" | L.A. Clippers
| 70 || 65 || 35.7 || .458 || .384 || .812 || 5.6 || 2.7 || 1.0 || .1 || 22.1
|-
| align="left" | 
| align="left" | Golden State
| 51 || 19 || 31.1 || .461 || .253 || .824 || 5.5 || 1.8 || .9 || .2 || 18.6
|-
| align="left" | 
| align="left" | Golden State
| 70 || 49 || 29.7 || .516 || .260 || .835 || 5.3 || 2.5 || .7 || .1 || 19.8
|-
| align="left" | 
| align="left" | Milwaukee
| 67 || 18 || 20.9 || .453 || .359 || .834 || 3.6 || 1.3 || .3 || .1 || 12.0
|-
| align="left" | 
| align="left" | Charlotte
| 32 || 28 || 27.5 || .373 || .364 || .856 || 3.9 || 1.2 || .7 || .0 || 15.0
|-
| align="left" | 
| align="left" | Detroit
| 18 || 0 || 14.3 || .355 || .238 || .750 || 1.4 || 1.1 || .3 || .1 || 5.3
|- class="sortbottom"
| style="text-align:center;" colspan="2"| Career
| 827 || 478 || 28.2 || .453 || .324 || .822 || 4.9 || 2.1 || .7 || .2 || 16.0

Playoffs

|-
| align="left" | 2006
| align="left" | L.A. Clippers
| 12 || 2 || 24.3 || .467 || .333 || .910 || 7.3 || 1.4 || .6 || .4 || 15.3
|- class="sortbottom"
| style="text-align:center;" colspan="2"| Career
| 12 || 2 || 24.3 || .467 || .333 || .910 || 7.3 || 1.4 || .6 || .4 || 15.3

References

External links

1979 births
Living people
American men's basketball players
Basketball players from Illinois
Big3 players
Charlotte Bobcats players
Detroit Pistons players
Duke Blue Devils men's basketball players
Golden State Warriors players
Los Angeles Clippers players
McDonald's High School All-Americans
Milwaukee Bucks players
Orlando Magic players
Parade High School All-Americans (boys' basketball)
People from Melrose Park, Illinois
Seattle SuperSonics draft picks
Shooting guards
Small forwards
American men's 3x3 basketball players